Al Landis (born November 2, 1954) is a former member of the Ohio House of Representatives, who served in that body from 2011 to 2018.

Ohio House of Representatives
As a member of the Ohio House of Representatives, Landis supported the controversial Ohio Senate Bill 5 which placed dramatic restrictions on the collective bargaining rights of public employee unions.

Landis was sworn into his first term on January 3, 2011, and is a member of the committees on Agriculture and Natural Resources, Economic and Small Business Development, Public Utilities, and Veterans Affairs (as vice chair).

In 2014, Landis was reelected for a third term, defeating his Democratic opponent with 67.71% of the vote.

References

Living people
Republican Party members of the Ohio House of Representatives
People from Dover, Ohio
1954 births
21st-century American politicians